San Francisco de Asís Parish is the Catholic church and parish house of the people of Apaxco de Ocampo. Has always belonged to the Diocese of Cuautitlán in Mexico. This church is located in the center of city. This colonial building is a monument of great architectural importance dedicated to Francis of Assisi.

References 

Apaxco
1609 establishments in North America
Spanish Colonial architecture in Mexico
Roman Catholic churches in Mexico
Franciscan churches in Mexico
Spanish Catholic Evangelisation in Teotlalpan
Roman Catholic Diocese of Cuautitlán